Chakra is a 1981 Hindi movie directed by Rabindra Dharmaraj. The film stars Smita Patil, Naseeruddin Shah and Kulbhushan Kharbanda.

Plot 
Amma (Smita Patil) and her son Benwa (Ranjit Chowdhry) become Bombay's slum-dwellers after running away from their village after her husband kills a moneylender who tried to rape her. The husband is then shot trying to steal some tin to build a hut.

In Bombay, Amma has a lover who provides for her and her son. Since the lover is a truck driver who travels most of the time, Amma takes on another lover – a vain pimp and petty crook, Lukka (Naseeruddin Shah), who becomes Benwa's idol. Lukka is on parole and ordered to be present before the police every day.

Benwa marries the young Amli (Alka Kubal). Amma meanwhile becomes pregnant, though it is never clear whose child it is. Amma, of course, lets Anna (Kulbhushan Kharbanda) know that it is his because she knows that of her two lovers, he alone is capable and responsible enough to take care of her and her child.

Lukka reappears, ravaged by syphilis and drugs; he is now a changed man and is disenchanted with the criminal life. But he still lives a life of crime and it is implied that there is no other choice for him. He even tries to dissuade Benwa from a life of crime without much success. Lukka is assaulted by the police at his illicit liquor den. The climax has Lukka assaulting a chemist who refuses to give him medicines unless he pays for it. Lukka grabs some medicines and makes a run for it, is chased by the police and hides in Amma's hut. The cops find him and arrest both him and Benwa, beating them brutally in the process. Amma has a miscarriage in the scuffle. In the end, bulldozers arrives to flatten the entire slum. A sort of exodus is shown in the final moments of the movie – and Benwa and Amli move on to a new slum, and a new shanty hut to continue the Chakra.

Cast 
 Smita Patil as Amma
 Dilip Dhawan as Amma's husband
 Kaluram Dhobale as Child
 Arun Bakshi as Police inspector 
 Naseeruddin Shah as Lukka
 Kulbhushan Kharbanda as Anna
 Rohini Hattangadi as Laxmi
 Ranjit Chowdhry as Benwa
 Salim Ghouse as Raghu
 Anjali Paigankar as Chenna
 Savita Bajaj as mentally challenged Chamnya's mother
 Suresh Bhagwat as Sweeper
 Yunus Parvez as Minister
 Suhas Bhalekar as drunkard in slums
 Alka Kubal as Amli
 Sudhir Pandey as Bhandari
 Uttam Sirur as Chamnya
 Sharayu Bhopatkar as Bhagi
 Satish Kaushik as bootpolish guy
 Madan Jain as Amli's brother
 Sumant Mastakar as Amli's father
 Ratan Gaurang as watchman

Awards & nominations

References

External links 
 

1981 films
1980s Hindi-language films
Films featuring a Best Actress National Award-winning performance
Golden Leopard winners
Films set in Mumbai